The Men's 400m T36 had its Final held on September 10 at 19:40.

Medalists

Results

References
Final

Athletics at the 2008 Summer Paralympics